The 1998–99 Eastern Counties Football League season was the 57th in the history of Eastern Counties Football League a football competition in England.

Premier Division

The Premier Division featured 20 clubs which competed in the division last season, along with two new clubs, promoted from Division One:
Ipswich Wanderers
Maldon Town

League table

Division One

Division One featured 15 clubs which competed in the division last season, along with three new clubs:
Clacton Town, relegated from the Premier Division
Dereham Town, joined from the Anglian Combination
Tiptree United, relegated from the Premier Division

League table

References

External links
 Eastern Counties Football League

1998-99
1998–99 in English football leagues